Robert Morris Doyle (May 5, 1853 – December 15, 1925) was a Rear Admiral in the United States Navy.

Biography
Doyle was born on May 5, 1853 in Dyersburg, Tennessee. During the Spanish–American War, he was the navigating officer of the USS Dixie. He died on December 15, 1925 in Miami, Florida.

References

1853 births
1925 deaths
American military personnel of the Spanish–American War
Burials at Arlington National Cemetery
People from Dyersburg, Tennessee
United States Navy rear admirals